Jonathan Lundberg (born 27 October 1997) is a Swedish footballer who plays for Karlslunds IF as a forward.

Career

Karlslunds IF
Joining Rynninge IK in December 2017, he played for the club until the end of 2019. He then joined fellow Division 1 Norra side Karlslunds IF HFK, signing with the club on 1 December 2019.

References

External links
  (archive)
  (archive)

1997 births
Living people
Swedish footballers
Örebro SK players
Rynninge IK players
Karlslunds IF players
Allsvenskan players
Ettan Fotboll players
Association football forwards